Caribea is a genus of flowering plants belonging to the family Nyctaginaceae.

Its native range is Eastern Cuba.

Species:
 Caribea litoralis  Alain

References

Nyctaginaceae
Caryophyllales genera